Charles Byer (February 28, 1893 – November 28, 1953) was an American film actor of the silent era. He appeared in films for a variety of companies including Fox, Paramount, Tiffany, and First National Pictures. He played a mixture of supporting and leading roles.

Selected filmography

 Headin' Home (1920)
 Ten Nights in a Bar Room (1921)
 The Man Who Paid (1922)
 How Women Love (1922)
 Lost in a Big City (1923)
 Unseeing Eyes (1923)
 The Trail of the Law (1924)
 Week End Husbands (1924)
 Youth for Sale (1924)
 The Unguarded Hour (1925)
 A Man Must Live (1925)
 The Shock Punch (1925)
 The Pace That Thrills (1925)
 The Virgin Wife (1926)
 So's Your Old Man (1926)
 Shanghai Bound (1927)
 New York (1927)
 Cabaret (1927)
 Beautiful But Dumb (1928)
 Taxi 13 (1928)
 Clothes Make the Woman (1928)
 Dead Man's Curve (1928)
 A Horseman of the Plains(1928)
 Alex the Great (1928)
 Red Riders of Canada (1928)
 Side Street (1929)
 The Delightful Rogue (1929)
 Molly and Me (1929)
 Red Hot Speed (1929)
 Romance of the Rio Grande (1929)

References

Bibliography
 Bruce Babington & Charles Barr. The Call of the Heart: John M. Stahl and Hollywood Melodrama. Indiana University Press, 2018.

External links

1893 births
1953 deaths
American male film actors
People from Newark, New Jersey
American male silent film actors
20th-century American male actors